Lennox Lewis vs. David Tua, billed as Royal Rampage, was a professional boxing match contested on November 11, 2000 for the WBC, IBF, and IBO heavyweight championships.

Background
After becoming the Undisputed Heavyweight Champion in 1999, Lennox Lewis successfully defended his crown twice in easy second round knockout victories over Michael Grant and Francois Botha. Following his victory over Botha, Lewis quickly set his sights on mandatory challenger David Tua, who was ranked number one by both the WBC and IBF. Though Lewis had hoped to have the bout in his boyhood home of Toronto, Canada, it was ultimately switched to the Mandalay Bay Resort & Casino in Paradise, Nevada. Tua came into the fight sporting an impressive 37–1 record, with victories over future Heavyweight champions John Ruiz, Oleg Maskaev and Hasim Rahman and his only loss coming against undefeated prospect Ike Ibeabuchi by unanimous decision. Though he came into the fight as a 3–1 underdog, Tua was confident he could defeat Lewis, calling him a "lazy fighter" while also stating "He tends to get tired after two or three rounds. "He gets vulnerable. His chin is very suspect. The only way to win is to knock Lennox Lewis out"

The fight
Unlike Lewis' previous two fights which did not make it past the second round, this fight went the full 12 rounds. Though Lewis landed a right hook early in the first round, cracking one of Tua's ribs, Lewis was unable to gain a knockdown over Tua. Nevertheless, Lewis was able to control almost the entire fight, outpunching Tua 674 to 413, while outlanding him 300 to 110 en route to a lopsided unanimous decision. All three judges ruled in favor of Lewis with scores of 119–109, 118–110 and 117–111.

Aftermath
The bout would prove to be the only major championship fight of Tua's career. Following his loss to Lewis, Tua took part in a four-man, three fight tournament to determine the IBF's number one contender. Tua defeated Danell Nicholson to advance to the final where he would meet Chris Byrd, who ultimately defeated Tua by unanimous decision to earn a match for the IBF Heavyweight title. Lewis, meanwhile, followed his victory over Tua with a match against little-known Hasim Rahman. Despite being a 20–1 underdog, Rahman stunned the boxing world by knocking out Lewis in the fifth round to become the new heavyweight champion.

References

Tua
2000 in boxing
Boxing in Las Vegas
2000 in sports in Nevada
World Boxing Council heavyweight championship matches
International Boxing Federation heavyweight championship matches
November 2000 sports events in the United States